2021 Pac-12 Conference Tournament may refer to:

2021 Pac-12 Conference men's basketball tournament
2021 Pac-12 Conference women's basketball tournament